Brežec pri Divači is a small settlement in the Municipality of Divača in the Littoral region of Slovenia.

Name
The name of the settlement was changed from Brežec to Brežec pri Divači in 1955.

References

External links
Brežec pri Divači on Geopedia

Populated places in the Municipality of Divača